Beatriz Nogalez González (born 3 March 1983) is a Spanish rhythmic gymnast, born in Álava. She competed at the 2000 Summer Olympics in Sydney.

References

External links

1983 births
Living people
Sportspeople from Álava
Spanish rhythmic gymnasts
Olympic gymnasts of Spain
Gymnasts at the 2000 Summer Olympics
Gymnasts from the Basque Country (autonomous community)